Tillandsia flabellata is a species of flowering plant in the family Bromeliaceae. This species is native to southern Mexico (Veracruz, Oaxaca, Chiapas) and Central America (Guatemala, El Salvador, Honduras, Nicaragua).

Two varieties are recognized:

Tillandsia flabellata var. flabellata - Oaxaca, Chiapas, Guatemala, El Salvador, Honduras, Nicaragua
Tillandsia flabellata var. viridifolia M.B.Foster - Veracruz

Cultivars
 Tillandsia 'Bacchus'
 Tillandsia 'Brooyar'
 Tillandsia 'Cooloola'
 Tillandsia 'Graceful'
 Tillandsia 'Gympie'
 Tillandsia 'Inskip'
 Tillandsia 'Latas au Pair'
 Tillandsia 'Little Richard Olson'
 Tillandsia 'Oeseriana'
 Tillandsia 'Yabba'

References

flabellata
Flora of Mexico
Flora of Central America
Plants described in 1887
Taxa named by John Gilbert Baker